Mood Indigo ("The froth of days") is a 2013 French surrealistic romantic science fantasy  film co-written and directed by Michel Gondry and co-written and produced by Luc Bossi, starring Romain Duris and Audrey Tautou. It is an adaptation of Boris Vian's 1947 novel with the same French title, translated Froth on the Daydream in English.

The film received two nominations at the 4th Magritte Awards. It also received three nominations at the 39th César Awards, winning in one category.

Plot
Colin has a very pleasant life: he is rich, he loves the food his cook makes (Nicolas), he loves his pianocktail (portmanteau of piano and cocktail, a word invented by Vian) and his friend Chick.

One day while having lunch with Chick, Chick tells him that he met a girl named Alise with whom he has a common passion: the writer Jean-Sol Partre (a spoonerism of Jean-Paul Sartre who was Boris Vian's friend).  Colin meets Chloe at a party Chick invited him to. They fall in love, marry, but Chloe becomes ill during their honeymoon. As time passes, Chloe's condition deteriorates while the relationship between Chick and Alise turns sour.  Frustrated with their own deteriorating relationships, Colin and Alise sleep with each other, although they both come to regret it shortly after.

The aesthetic of the film changes from colorful and whimsical to monochromatic and tragic as the film progresses.  These effects are observed most acutely in Colin's home, which decays supernaturally, and his mouse, who reluctantly tolerates the house until he abandons Colin.

Colin spends his fortune on treating Chloe, which causes him to passionately fire his cook and sell his pianocktail, and he slips into poverty as Chloe passes away.  His friend Chick spends both his and Colin's money on anything that has to do with Partre, and Chick loses his job due to a Partre-related incident and is later killed when resisting law-enforcement officers.  Alise tracks down Partre himself and kills him. Afterwards, Alise disappears. Colin, Nicolas, and his fiancé, Isis, hold a funeral for Chloe. Unable to bear the grief, Colin jumps into a river, sinking into the darkness.

Cast
 Romain Duris as Colin
 Audrey Tautou as Chloé
 Gad Elmaleh as Chick
 Aïssa Maïga as Alise
 Omar Sy as Nicolas
 Charlotte Le Bon as Isis
 Sacha Bourdo as The mice
 Natacha Régnier as The remedy saleswoman
 Philippe Torreton as Jean-Sol Partre
 Alain Chabat as Gouffé
 Zinedine Soualem as The plant manager
 Laurent Lafitte as The society's owner
 August Darnell as Duke Ellington
 Michel Gondry as Docteur Mangemanche (uncredited)

Production
The screenplay was written by Luc Bossi and Michel Gondry and based on the 1947 novel Froth on the Daydream by Boris Vian. The novel had previously been adapted into a 1968 French film with the English title Spray of the Days, and a 2001 Japanese film with the title Chloe. Mood Indigo was produced by Brio Films, with co-production support from France 2 Cinéma, StudioCanal, and the Belgian company Scope Pictures. It was pre-acquired by Canal+ and Ciné+, and received 650,000 euro from Eurimages. The total budget was 19 million euro. Filming started 10 April 2012 and ended on 23 July. Locations were used in Belgium and around Paris.

Release
The film premiered in France and Belgium on 24 April 2013. Drafthouse Films released the film in the United States in a version cut down to 94 minutes, compared to the full runtime of 131 minutes.

Reception
The film had 861,627 admissions in France. At AlloCiné's review aggregator, it has an average score of 3.0 out of 5 based on 34 French-language reviews. On Rotten Tomatoes, it holds a 62% approval rating based on 105 reviews, with an average rating of 6/10. The critical consensus reads, "Mood Indigo is far from Michel Gondry's most compelling work, but it doesn't skimp on the visual whimsy and heartfelt emotion fans have come to expect". It also holds a 54/100 rating on Metacritic, based on 26 critics, indicating "mixed or average reviews".

References

External links
 

2013 films
French fantasy films
Belgian fantasy films
Films directed by Michel Gondry
Films shot in Paris
Films shot in Belgium
Films based on French novels
Science fantasy films
Cultural depictions of Duke Ellington
Cultural depictions of Jean-Paul Sartre
2010s French-language films
French-language Belgian films
2010s French films